Mirzazhanov Sharipzhon Atoyevich is the founder of Hizb-an-Nusra, a militant Islamist organization that advocates the violent overthrow of all Central Asian governments and replacing them with a Central Asian caliphate. He is a former member of Hizb ut-Tahrir, an international Islamist organization.

References

Terrorism in Central Asia
Uzbekistani Islamists
Year of birth missing (living people)
Living people
Former members of Hizb ut-Tahrir
Uzbekistani expatriates in Pakistan